Li Wenshan (August 1928 – February 20, 2014) was a People's Republic of China politician. He was born in Wu'an, Hebei. He was CPPCC Committee Chairman of his home province.

1928 births
2014 deaths
People's Republic of China politicians from Hebei
Chinese Communist Party politicians from Hebei
Deputy Communist Party secretaries of Hebei
Chairmen of the CPPCC Hebei Committee
Members of the 8th Chinese People's Political Consultative Conference
Members of the 9th Chinese People's Political Consultative Conference